Andrei Arsenyevich Tarkovsky (4 April 1932 – 29 December 1986) was a Russian filmmaker. Widely considered one of the greatest and most influential directors in cinema history, his films explore spiritual and metaphysical themes, and are noted for their slow pacing and long takes, dreamlike visual imagery, and preoccupation with nature and memory.

Tarkovsky studied film at Moscow's VGIK under filmmaker Mikhail Romm, and subsequently directed his first five features in the Soviet Union: Ivan's Childhood (1962), Andrei Rublev (1966), Solaris (1972), Mirror (1975), and Stalker (1979). A number of his films from this period are ranked among the best films ever made. After years of creative conflict with state film authorities, Tarkovsky left the country in 1979 and made his final two films abroad; Nostalghia (1983) and The Sacrifice (1986) were produced in Italy and Sweden respectively. In 1986, he also published a book about cinema and art entitled Sculpting in Time. He died later that year of cancer, a condition possibly caused by the toxic locations used in the filming of Stalker.

Tarkovsky was the recipient of several awards at the Cannes Film Festival throughout his career (including the FIPRESCI prize, the Prize of the Ecumenical Jury, and the Grand Prix Spécial du Jury and winner of the Golden Lion award at the Venice Film Festival for his debut film Ivan's Childhood. In 1990, he was posthumously awarded the Soviet Union's prestigious Lenin Prize. Three of his films—Andrei Rublev, Mirror, and Stalker—featured in Sight & Sound 2012 poll of the 100 greatest films of all time.

Life and career

Childhood and early life
Andrei Tarkovsky was born in the village of Zavrazhye in the Yuryevetsky District of the Ivanovo Industrial Oblast (modern-day Kadyysky District of the Kostroma Oblast, Russia) to the poet and translator Arseny Aleksandrovich Tarkovsky, a native of Yelysavethrad (now Kropyvnytskyi, Ukraine), and Maria Ivanova Vishnyakova, a graduate of the Maxim Gorky Literature Institute who later worked as a proofreader; she was born in Moscow in the Dubasov family estate.

Andrei's paternal grandfather Aleksandr Karlovich Tarkovsky (in ) was a Polish nobleman who worked as a bank clerk. His wife Maria Danilovna Rachkovskaya was a Romanian language teacher who arrived from Iași. Andrei's maternal grandmother Vera Nikolayevna Vishnyakova (née Dubasova) belonged to an old Dubasov family of Russian nobility that traces its history back to the 17th century; among her relatives was Admiral Fyodor Dubasov, a fact she had to conceal during the Soviet days. She was married to Ivan Ivanovich Vishnyakov, a native of the Kaluga Governorate who studied law at the Moscow State University and served as a judge in Kozelsk.

According to the family legend, Tarkovsky's ancestors on his father's side were princes from the Shamkhalate of Tarki, Dagestan, although his sister Marina Tarkovskaya who did a detailed research on their genealogy called it "a myth, even a prank of sorts," stressing that none of the documents confirms this version.

Tarkovsky spent his childhood in Yuryevets. He was described by childhood friends as active and popular, having many friends and being typically in the center of action. His father left the family in 1937, subsequently volunteering for the army in 1941. He returned home in 1943, having been awarded a Red Star after being shot in one of his legs (which he would eventually need to amputate due to gangrene). Tarkovsky stayed with his mother, moving with her and his sister Marina to Moscow, where she worked as a proofreader at a printing press.

In 1939, Tarkovsky enrolled at the Moscow School No. 554. During the war, the three evacuated to Yuryevets, living with his maternal grandmother. In 1943, the family returned to Moscow. Tarkovsky continued his studies at his old school, where the poet Andrei Voznesensky was one of his classmates. He studied piano at a music school and attended classes at an art school. The family lived on Shchipok Street in the Zamoskvorechye District in Moscow. From November 1947 to spring 1948 he was in the hospital with tuberculosis. Many themes of his childhood—the evacuation, his mother and her two children, the withdrawn father, the time in the hospital—feature prominently in his film Mirror.

In his school years, Tarkovsky was a troublemaker and a poor student. He still managed to graduate, and from 1951 to 1952 studied Arabic at the Oriental Institute in Moscow, a branch of the Academy of Sciences of the Soviet Union. Although he already spoke some Arabic and was a successful student in his first semesters, he did not finish his studies and dropped out to work as a prospector for the Academy of Science Institute for Non-Ferrous Metals and Gold. He participated in a year-long research expedition to the river Kureyka near Turukhansk in the Krasnoyarsk Province. During this time in the taiga, Tarkovsky decided to study film.

Film school student
Upon returning from the research expedition in 1954, Tarkovsky applied at the State Institute of Cinematography (VGIK) and was admitted to the film-directing program. He was in the same class as Irma Raush (Irina) whom he married in April 1957.

The early Khrushchev era offered good opportunities for young film directors. Before 1953, annual film production was low and most films were directed by veteran directors. After 1953, more films were produced, many of them by young directors. The Khrushchev Thaw relaxed Soviet social restrictions a bit and permitted a limited influx of European and North American literature, films and music. This allowed Tarkovsky to see films of the Italian neorealists, French New Wave, and of directors such as Kurosawa, Buñuel, Bergman, Bresson, Wajda (whose film Ashes and Diamonds influenced Tarkovsky) and Mizoguchi.

Tarkovsky's teacher and mentor was Mikhail Romm, who taught many film students who would later become influential film directors. In 1956, Tarkovsky directed his first student short film, The Killers, from a short story of Ernest Hemingway. The longer television film There Will Be No Leave Today followed in 1959. Both films were a collaboration between the VGIK students. Classmate Aleksandr Gordon, who married Tarkovsky's sister, in particular directed, wrote, edited, and acted in the two films with Tarkovsky.

An important influence on Tarkovsky was the film director Grigory Chukhray, who was teaching at the VGIK. Impressed by the talent of his student, Chukhray offered Tarkovsky a position as assistant director for his film Clear Skies. Tarkovsky initially showed interest but then decided to concentrate on his studies and his own projects.

During his third year at the VGIK, Tarkovsky met Andrei Konchalovsky. They found much in common as they liked the same film directors and shared ideas on cinema and films. In 1959, they wrote the script Antarctica – Distant Country, which was later published in the Moskovsky Komsomolets. Tarkovsky submitted the script to Lenfilm, but it was rejected. They were more successful with the script The Steamroller and the Violin, which they sold to Mosfilm. This became Tarkovsky's graduation project, earning him his diploma in 1960 and winning First Prize at the New York Student Film Festival in 1961.

Film career in the Soviet Union
Tarkovsky's first feature film was Ivan's Childhood in 1962. He had inherited the film from director Eduard Abalov, who had to abort the project. The film earned Tarkovsky international acclaim and won the Golden Lion award at the Venice Film Festival in the year 1962. In the same year, on 30 September, his first son Arseny (called Senka in Tarkovsky's diaries) Tarkovsky was born.

In 1965, he directed the film Andrei Rublev about the life of Andrei Rublev, the fifteenth-century Russian icon painter. Andrei Rublev was not, except for a single screening in Moscow in 1966, immediately released after completion due to problems with Soviet authorities. Tarkovsky had to cut the film several times, resulting in several different versions of varying lengths. The film was widely released in the Soviet Union in a cut version in 1971. Nevertheless, the film had a budget of more than 1 million rubles – a significant sum for that period. A version of the film was presented at the Cannes Film Festival in 1969 and won the FIPRESCI prize.

He divorced his wife, Irina, in June 1970. In the same year, he married Larisa Kizilova (née Egorkina), who had been a production assistant for the film Andrei Rublev (they had been living together since 1965). Their son, Andrei Andreyevich Tarkovsky, (nicknamed Andriosha, meaning "little Andre" or "Andre Junior") was born in the same year on 7 August.

In 1972, he completed Solaris, an adaptation of the novel Solaris by Stanisław Lem. He had worked on this together with screenwriter Friedrich Gorenstein as early as 1968. The film was presented at the Cannes Film Festival, won the Grand Prix Spécial du Jury, and was nominated for the Palme d'Or.

From 1973 to 1974, he shot the film Mirror, a highly autobiographical and unconventionally structured film drawing on his childhood and incorporating some of his father's poems. In this film Tarkovsky portrayed the plight of childhood affected by war. Tarkovsky had worked on the screenplay for this film since 1967, under the consecutive titles Confession, White day and A white, white day. From the beginning the film was not well received by Soviet authorities due to its content and its perceived elitist nature. Soviet authorities placed the film in the "third category", a severely limited distribution, and only allowed it to be shown in third-class cinemas and workers' clubs. Few prints were made and the film-makers received no returns. Third category films also placed the film-makers in danger of being accused of wasting public funds, which could have serious effects on their future productivity. These difficulties are presumed to have made Tarkovsky play with the idea of going abroad and producing a film outside the Soviet film industry.

During 1975, Tarkovsky also worked on the screenplay Hoffmanniana, about the German writer and poet E. T. A. Hoffmann. In December 1976, he directed Hamlet, his only stage play, at the Lenkom Theatre in Moscow. The main role was played by Anatoly Solonitsyn, who also acted in several of Tarkovsky's films. At the end of 1978, he also wrote the screenplay Sardor together with the writer Aleksandr Misharin.

The last film Tarkovsky completed in the Soviet Union was Stalker, inspired by the novel Roadside Picnic by the brothers Arkady and Boris Strugatsky. Tarkovsky had met the brothers first in 1971 and was in contact with them until his death in 1986. Initially he wanted to shoot a film based on their novel Dead Mountaineer's Hotel and he developed a raw script. Influenced by a discussion with Arkady Strugatsky he changed his plan and began to work on the script based on Roadside Picnic. Work on this film began in 1976. The production was mired in troubles; improper development of the negatives had ruined all the exterior shots. Tarkovsky's relationship with cinematographer Georgy Rerberg deteriorated to the point where he hired Alexander Knyazhinsky as a new first cinematographer. Furthermore, Tarkovsky had a heart attack in April 1978, resulting in further delay. The film was completed in 1979 and won the Prize of the Ecumenical Jury at the Cannes Film Festival. In a question and answer session at the Edinburgh Filmhouse on 11 February 1981, Tarkovsky trenchantly rejected suggestions that the film was either impenetrably mysterious or a political allegory.

In 1979, Tarkovsky began production of the film The First Day (Russian: Первый День Pervyj Dyen), based on a script by his friend and long-term collaborator Andrei Konchalovsky. The film was set in 18th-century Russia during the reign of Peter the Great and starred Natalya Bondarchuk and Anatoli Papanov. To get the project approved by Goskino, Tarkovsky submitted a script that was different from the original script, omitting several scenes that were critical of the official atheism in the Soviet Union. After shooting roughly half of the film the project was stopped by Goskino after it became apparent that the film differed from the script submitted to the censors. Tarkovsky was reportedly infuriated by this interruption and destroyed most of the film.

Film career outside the Soviet Union
During the summer of 1979, Tarkovsky traveled to Italy, where he shot the documentary Voyage in Time together with his long-time friend Tonino Guerra. Tarkovsky returned to Italy in 1980 for an extended trip, during which he and Guerra completed the script for the film Nostalghia. During this period, he took Polaroid photographs depicting his personal life.

Tarkovsky returned to Italy in 1982 to start shooting Nostalghia, but Mosfilm then withdrew from the project, so he sought and received financial backing from the Italian RAI. Tarkovsky completed the film in 1983, and it was presented at the Cannes Film Festival where it won the FIPRESCI prize and the Prize of the Ecumenical Jury. Tarkovsky also shared a special prize called Grand Prix du cinéma de creation with Robert Bresson. Soviet authorities lobbied to prevent the film from winning the Palme d'Or, a fact that hardened Tarkovsky's resolve to never work in the Soviet Union again. After Cannes he went to London to stage and choreograph the opera Boris Godunov at the Royal Opera House under the musical direction of Claudio Abbado.

At a press conference in Milan on 10 July 1984, he announced that he would never return to the Soviet Union and would remain in Western Europe. He stated, "I am not a Soviet dissident, I have no conflict with the Soviet Government," but if he returned home, he added, "I would be unemployed." At that time, his son Andriosha was still in the Soviet Union and not allowed to leave the country. On 28 August 1985, Tarkovsky was processed as a Soviet Defector at a refugee camp in Latina, Italy, registered with the serial number 13225/379, and officially welcomed to the West.

Tarkovsky spent most of 1984 preparing the film The Sacrifice. It was finally shot in 1985 in Sweden, with many of the crew being alumni from Ingmar Bergman's films, including cinematographer Sven Nykvist. Tarkovsky's vision of his film was greatly influenced by Bergman's style.

While The Sacrifice is about an apocalypse and impending death, faith, and possible redemption, in the making-of documentary Directed by Andrei Tarkovsky, in a particularly poignant scene, writer/director Michal Leszczylowski follows Tarkovsky on a walk as he expresses his sentiments on death—he claims himself to be immortal and has no fear of dying. Ironically, at the end of the year Tarkovsky was diagnosed with terminal lung cancer. In January 1986, he began treatment in Paris and was joined there by his son, Andre Jr, who was finally allowed to leave the Soviet Union. What would be Tarkovsky's final film was dedicated to him.

The Sacrifice was presented at the Cannes Film Festival and received the Grand Prix Spécial du Jury, the FIPRESCI prize and the Prize of the Ecumenical Jury. As Tarkovsky was unable to attend due to his illness, the prizes were collected by his son.

Death

In Tarkovsky's last diary entry (15 December 1986), he wrote: "But now I have no strength left—that is the problem". The diaries are sometimes also known as Martyrology and were published posthumously in 1989 and in English in 1991.

Tarkovsky died in Paris on 29 December 1986. His funeral ceremony was held at the Alexander Nevsky Cathedral. He was buried on 3 January 1987 in the Russian Cemetery in Sainte-Geneviève-des-Bois in France. The inscription on his gravestone, which was erected in 1994, was conceived by Tarkovsky's wife, Larisa, reads: To the man who saw the Angel. Larisa died in 1998 and is buried beside her husband.

A conspiracy theory emerged in Russia in the early 1990s when it was alleged that Tarkovsky did not die of natural causes, but was assassinated by the KGB. Evidence for this hypothesis includes testimonies by former KGB agents who claim that Viktor Chebrikov gave the order to eradicate Tarkovsky to curtail what the Soviet government and the KGB saw as anti-Soviet propaganda by Tarkovsky. Other evidence includes several memoranda that surfaced after the 1991 coup and the claim by one of Tarkovsky's doctors that his cancer could not have developed from a natural cause.

As with Tarkovsky, his wife Larisa and actor Anatoly Solonitsyn all died from the very same type of lung cancer. Vladimir Sharun, sound designer in Stalker, is convinced that they were all poisoned by the chemical plant where they were shooting the film.

Influences
Tarkovsky became a film director during the mid and late 1950s, a period referred to as the Khrushchev Thaw, during which Soviet society opened to foreign films, literature and music, among other things. This allowed Tarkovsky to see films of European, American and Japanese directors, an experience that influenced his own film making. His teacher and mentor at the film school, Mikhail Romm, allowed his students considerable freedom and emphasized the independence of the film director.

Tarkovsky was, according to fellow student Shavkat Abdusalmov, fascinated by Japanese films. He was amazed by how every character on the screen is exceptional and how everyday events such as a Samurai cutting bread with his sword are elevated to something special and put into the limelight. Tarkovsky has also expressed interest in the art of Haiku and its ability to create "images in such a way that they mean nothing beyond themselves".

Tarkovsky was also a deeply religious Orthodox Christian, who believed great art should have a higher spiritual purpose. He was a perfectionist not given to humor or humility: his signature style was ponderous and literary, having many characters that pondered over religious themes and issues regarding faith.

Tarkovsky perceived that the art of cinema has only been truly mastered by very few filmmakers, stating in a 1970 interview with Naum Abramov that "they can be counted on the fingers of one hand". In 1972, Tarkovsky told film historian Leonid Kozlov his ten favorite films. The list includes: Diary of a Country Priest and Mouchette by Robert Bresson; Winter Light, Wild Strawberries, and Persona by Ingmar Bergman; Nazarín by Luis Buñuel; City Lights by Charlie Chaplin; Ugetsu by Kenji Mizoguchi; Seven Samurai by Akira Kurosawa, and Woman in the Dunes by Hiroshi Teshigahara. Among his favorite directors were Buñuel, Mizoguchi, Bergman, Bresson, Kurosawa, Michelangelo Antonioni, Jean Vigo, and Carl Theodor Dreyer.

With the exception of City Lights, the list does not contain any films of the early silent era. The reason is that Tarkovsky saw film as an art as only a relatively recent phenomenon, with the early film-making forming only a prelude. The list has also no films or directors from Tarkovsky's native Russia, although he rated Soviet directors such as Boris Barnet, Sergei Parajanov and Alexander Dovzhenko highly. He said of Dovzhenko's Earth: "I have lived a lot among very simple farmers and met extraordinary people. They spread calmness, had such tact, they conveyed a feeling of dignity and displayed wisdom that I have seldom come across on such a scale. Dovzhenko had obviously understood wherein the sense of life resides. [...] This trespassing of the border between nature and mankind is an ideal place for the existence of man. Dovzhenko understood this."

Andrei Tarkovsky was not a fan of science fiction, largely dismissing it for its "comic book" trappings and vulgar commercialism. However, in a famous exception Tarkovsky praised the blockbuster film The Terminator, saying that its "vision of the future and the relation between man and its destiny is pushing the frontier of cinema as an art". He was critical of the "brutality and low acting skills", but was nevertheless impressed by the film.

Cinematic style
In a 1962 interview, Tarkovsky argued: "All art, of course, is intellectual, but for me, all the arts, and cinema even more so, must above all be emotional and act upon the heart." His films are characterized by metaphysical themes, extremely long takes, and images often considered by critics to be of exceptional beauty. Recurring motifs are dreams, memory, childhood, running water accompanied by fire, rain indoors, reflections, levitation, and characters re-appearing in the foreground of long panning movements of the camera. He once said: "Juxtaposing a person with an environment that is boundless, collating him with a countless number of people passing by close to him and far away, relating a person to the whole world, that is the meaning of cinema."

Tarkovsky incorporated levitation scenes into several of his films, most notably Solaris. To him these scenes possess great power and are used for their photogenic value and magical inexplicability. Water, clouds, and reflections were used by him for their surreal beauty and photogenic value, as well as their symbolism, such as waves or the forms of brooks or running water. Bells and candles are also frequent symbols. These are symbols of film, sight and sound, and Tarkovsky's film frequently has themes of self-reflection.

Tarkovsky developed a theory of cinema that he called "sculpting in time". By this he meant that the unique characteristic of cinema as a medium was to take our experience of time and alter it. Unedited movie footage transcribes time in real time. By using long takes and few cuts in his films, he aimed to give the viewers a sense of time passing, time lost, and the relationship of one moment in time to another.

Up to, and including, his film Mirror, Tarkovsky focused his cinematic works on exploring this theory. After Mirror, he announced that he would focus his work on exploring the dramatic unities proposed by Aristotle: a concentrated action, happening in one place, within the span of a single day.

Several of Tarkovsky's films have color or black-and-white sequences. This first occurs in the otherwise monochrome Andrei Rublev, which features a color epilogue of Rublev's authentic religious icon paintings. All of his films afterwards contain monochrome, and in Stalker's case sepia sequences, while otherwise being in color. In 1966, in an interview conducted shortly after finishing Andrei Rublev, Tarkovsky dismissed color film as a "commercial gimmick" and cast doubt on the idea that contemporary films meaningfully use color. He claimed that in everyday life one does not consciously notice colors most of the time, and that color should therefore be used in film mainly to emphasize certain moments, but not all the time, as this distracts the viewer. To him, films in color were like moving paintings or photographs, which are too beautiful to be a realistic depiction of life.

Director Ingmar Bergman commented on Tarkovsky:

Contrarily, however, Bergman conceded the truth in the claim made by a critic who wrote that "with Autumn Sonata Bergman does Bergman", adding: "Tarkovsky began to make Tarkovsky films, and that Fellini began to make Fellini films [...] Buñuel nearly always made Buñuel films." This pastiche of one's own work has been derogatorily termed as "self-karaoke".

Vadim Yusov
Tarkovsky worked in close collaboration with cinematographer Vadim Yusov from 1958 to 1972, and much of the visual style of Tarkovsky's films can be attributed to this collaboration. Tarkovsky would spend two days preparing for Yusov to film a single long take, and due to the preparation, usually only a single take was needed.

Sven Nykvist
In his last film, The Sacrifice, Tarkovsky worked with cinematographer Sven Nykvist, who had worked on many films with director Ingmar Bergman. (Nykvist was not alone: several people involved in the production had previously collaborated with Bergman, notably lead actor Erland Josephson, who had also acted for Tarkovsky in Nostalghia.) Nykvist complained that Tarkovsky would frequently look through the camera and even direct actors through it, but ultimately stated that choosing to work with Tarkovsky was one of the best choices he had ever made.

Filmography

Tarkovsky is mainly known as a film director. During his career he directed seven feature films, as well as three shorts from his time at VGIK. His features are:
 Ivan's Childhood (1962)
 Andrei Rublev (1966)
 Solaris (1972)
 Mirror (1975)
 Stalker (1979)
 Nostalghia (1983)
 The Sacrifice (1986)

He also wrote several screenplays. Furthermore, he directed the play Hamlet for the stage in Moscow, directed the opera Boris Godunov in London, and he directed a radio production of the short story Turnabout by William Faulkner. He also wrote Sculpting in Time, a book on film theory.

Tarkovsky's first feature film was Ivan's Childhood in 1962. He then directed Andrei Rublev in 1966, Solaris in 1972, Mirror in 1975 and Stalker in 1979. The documentary Voyage in Time was produced in Italy in 1982, as was Nostalghia in 1983. His last film The Sacrifice was produced in Sweden in 1986. Tarkovsky was personally involved in writing the screenplays for all his films, sometimes with a cowriter. Tarkovsky once said that a director who realizes somebody else's screenplay without being involved in it becomes a mere illustrator, resulting in dead and monotonous films.

Publications
 Sculpting in Time. University of Texas Press, 1986. .
 Time Within Time: The Diaries 1970–1986. Seagull, 1989. . Translated by Kitty Hunter-Blair.
Collected Screenplays. London: Faber & Faber, 2003. .
Instant Light, Tarkovsky Polaroids. London: Thames and Hudson, 2006. . A book of 60 photographs taken by Tarkovsky in Russia and Italy between 1979 and 1984. Edited by Italian photographer Giovanni Chiaramonte and Tarkovsky's son Andrey A. Tarkovsky.
Bright, bright day. Tarkovsky Foundation and White Space Gallery, 2008. A book of Polaroids edited by Stephen Gill. . Edition of 3000 copies.
Tarkovsky: Films, Stills, Polaroids & Writings. London: Thames and Hudson, 2019. .

Unproduced screenplays

Concentrate
Concentrate (Kontsentrat) is a never-filmed 1958 screenplay by Tarkovsky. The screenplay is based on Tarkovsky's year in the taiga as a member of a research expedition, prior to his enrollment in film school. It's about the leader of a geological expedition, who waits for the boat that brings back the concentrates collected by the expedition. The expedition is surrounded by mystery, and its purpose is a state secret.

Although some authors claim that the screenplay was filmed, according to Marina Tarkovskaya, Tarkovsky's sister (and wife of Aleksandr Gordon, a fellow student of Tarkovsky during his film school years) the screenplay was never filmed. Tarkovsky wrote the screenplay during his entrance examination at the State Institute of Cinematography (VGIK) in a single sitting. He earned the highest possible grade, "excellent" for this work. In 1994, fragments of Concentrate were filmed and used in the documentary Andrei Tarkovsky's Taiga Summer by Marina Tarkovskaya and Aleksandr Gordon.

Hoffmanniana

Hoffmanniana is a never-filmed 1974 screenplay by Tarkovsky. The screenplay is based on the life and work of German author E. T. A. Hoffmann. In 1974, an acquaintance from Tallinnfilm approached Tarkovsky to write a screenplay on a German theme. Tarkovsky considered Thomas Mann and E. T. A. Hoffmann, and also thought about Ibsen's Peer Gynt. In the end Tarkovsky signed a contract for a script based on the life and work of Hoffmann. He planned to write the script during the summer of 1974 at his dacha. Writing was not without difficulty, less than a month before the deadline he had not written a single page. He finally finished the project in late 1974 and submitted the final script to Tallinnfilm in October.

Although the script was well received by the officials at Tallinnfilm, it was the consensus that no one but Tarkovsky would be able to direct it. The script was sent to Goskino in February 1976, and although approval was granted for proceeding with making the film, the screenplay was never realized. In 1984, during the time of his exile in the West, Tarkovsky revisited the screenplay and made a few changes. He also considered to finally direct a film based on the screenplay but ultimately dropped this idea.

Films about Tarkovsky

 Voyage in Time (1983): documents the travels in Italy of Andrei Tarkovsky in preparation for the making of his film Nostalghia, Tonino Guerra.
 Tarkovsky: A Poet in the Cinema (1984): directed by Donatella Baglivo.
 Moscow Elegy (1987), a documentary/homage to Tarkovsky by Aleksandr Sokurov.
 Auf der Suche nach der verlorenen Zeit (1988): Andrej Tarkowskijs Exil und Tod. Documentary directed by Ebbo Demant. Germany.
 One Day in the Life of Andrei Arsenevich (1999): French documentary film directed by Chris Marker.
 "Andrey" (color/b&w, short-fiction, 35 mm, 15 min, 2006) A film by Nariné Mktchyan and Arsen Azatyan. Festivals: Yerevan IFF 2006, Rotterdam IFF 2007, Busan IFF 2007, Sydney Film Festival 2007, Zerkalo FF, Ivanovo (Special Prize) 2008, Kinoshock FF 2014.
 Tarkovsky: Time Within Time (2015): documentary by P. J. Letofsky.
 Andrei Tarkovsky: A Cinema Prayer (2019): a poetic documentary by Tarkovsky's son Andrei A. Tarkovsky

Awards and commemoration

Numerous awards were bestowed on Tarkovsky throughout his lifetime.
 At the Venice Film Festival, the Golden Lion of the for Ivan's Childhood
 At the Cannes Film Festival, the FIPRESCI prize three times, the Prize of the Ecumenical Jury three times (more than any other director), the Grand Prix Spécial du Jury twice, and the Best Director award once. He was also nominated for the Palme d'Or three times.
 In 1987, the BAFTA Award for Best Foreign Language Film of the British Academy of Film and Television Arts for The Sacrifice.

Under the influence of Glasnost and Perestroika, Tarkovsky was finally recognized in the Soviet Union in the Autumn of 1986, shortly before his death, by a retrospective of his films in Moscow. After his death, an entire issue of the film magazine Iskusstvo Kino was devoted to Tarkovsky. In their obituaries, the film committee of the Council of Ministers of the Soviet Union and the Union of Soviet Film Makers expressed their sorrow that Tarkovsky had to spend the last years of his life in exile.

Posthumously, he was awarded the Lenin Prize in 1990, one of the highest state honors in the Soviet Union. In 1989, the Andrei Tarkovsky Memorial Prize was established, with its first recipient being the Russian animator Yuri Norstein. In three consecutive events, the Moscow International Film Festival awarded the Andrei Tarkovsky Award in 1993, 1995, and 1997.

In 1996, the Andrei Tarkovsky Museum opened in Yuryevets, his childhood town. A minor planet, 3345 Tarkovskij, discovered by Soviet astronomer Lyudmila Karachkina in 1982, has been named after him.

Tarkovsky has been the subject of several documentaries. Most notable is the 1988 documentary Moscow Elegy, by Russian film director Alexander Sokurov. Sokurov's own work has been heavily influenced by Tarkovsky. The film consists mostly of narration over stock footage from Tarkovsky's films. Directed by Andrei Tarkovsky is a 1988 documentary film by Michal Leszczylowski, an editor of the film The Sacrifice. Film director Chris Marker produced the television documentary One Day in the Life of Andrei Arsenevich as an homage to Andrei Tarkovsky in 2000.

At the entrance to the Gerasimov Institute of Cinematography in Moscow, there is a monument that includes statues of Tarkovsky, Gennady Shpalikov and Vasily Shukshin.

Reception and legacy
Andrei Tarkovsky and his works have received praise from many filmmakers, critics and thinkers.

The Swedish filmmaker Ingmar Bergman was quoted as saying: "Tarkovsky for me is the greatest [of us all], the one who invented a new language, true to the nature of film, as it captures life as a reflection, life as a dream".

The Japanese filmmaker Akira Kurosawa remarked on Tarkovsky's films as saying: "His unusual sensitivity is both overwhelming and astounding. It almost reaches a pathological intensity. Probably there is no equal among film directors alive now." Kurosawa also commented: "I love all of Tarkovsky's films. I love his personality and all his works. Every cut from his films is a marvelous image in itself. But the finished image is nothing more than the imperfect accomplishment of his idea. His ideas are only realized in part. And he had to make do with it."

The Iranian filmmaker Abbas Kiarostami remarked that: "Tarkovsky's works separate me completely from physical life, and are the most spiritual films I have seen".

The Polish filmmaker Krzysztof Kieślowski commented that: "Andrei Tarkovsky was one of the greatest directors of recent years," and regarded Tarkovsky's film, Ivan's Childhood as an influence on his own work.

The Turkish filmmaker Nuri Bilge Ceylan when he first discovered the films of Andrei Tarkovsky as a college student unsure of what he wanted to do with his life, he was utterly baffled by the lauded Russian master. He walked out of a screening of Solaris at the halfway point, and stopped a VHS tape of Mirror at a similar juncture. Today, he considers the latter to be the greatest film ever made. "I've seen it maybe 20 times," he says.

The Armenian filmmaker Sergei Parajanov remarked that watching Tarkovsky's film, Ivan's Childhood was his main inspiration to become a filmmaker by saying: "I did not know how to do anything and I would not have done anything if there had not been Ivan's Childhood".

The Austrian filmmaker Michael Haneke voted for Mirror on his top 10 films in the 2002 Sight & Sound directors' poll and later said that he has seen the picture at least 25 times.

The German filmmaker Wim Wenders dedicated his film Wings of Desire to Tarkovsky (along with François Truffaut and Yasujirō Ozu).

The French filmmaker Chris Marker directed a documentary film as a homage to Tarkovsky called One Day in the Life of Andrei Arsenevich and used Tarkovsky's concept of "The Zone" (from the film, Stalker) for his 1983 film essay, Sans Soleil.

The Greek filmmaker Theo Angelopoulos regarded Tarkovsky's film Stalker as one of the films that influenced him.

The Polish filmmaker Andrzej Żuławski remarked that: "If anybody influenced anybody, it’s me being influenced by Tarkovsky, not the reverse." and called Tarkovsky's film Andrei Rublev a "masterpiece".

The Greek-Australian filmmaker Alex Proyas was "extremely influenced" by Tarkovsky's work and cited Stalker as one his favorite films.

The French philosopher Jean-Paul Sartre highly praised Tarkovsky's film Ivan's Childhood, saying that it was one of the most beautiful films he had ever seen.

The Japanese anime filmmaker Mamoru Oshii, known for his works such as Ghost in the Shell was influenced by Tarkovsky.

The Indian-born British American novelist Salman Rushdie praised Tarkovsky and his work Solaris by calling it a "a sci-fi masterpiece".

Film historian Steven Dillon says that much of subsequent film was deeply influenced by the films of Tarkovsky.

Mexican filmmaker Alejandro González Iñarritu is a huge fan of Tarkovsky. He once said in an interview: "Andrei Rublev is maybe my favorite film ever", and in another interview, he added: "I remember, the first time I saw a Tarkovsky film, I was shocked by it. I did not know what to do. I was shocked by it. I was fascinated, because suddenly I realized that film could have so many more layers to it than what I had imagined before". There are many direct references and hidden tributes to Tarkovsky's movies in Iñarritu's 2015 Oscar-winning drama The Revenant.

Danish film director Lars von Trier is a fervent admirer of Tarkovsky. He dedicated his 2009 film Antichrist to him, and, while discussing it with critic David Jenkins, asked: "Have you seen Mirror? I was hypnotised! I've seen it 20 times. It's the closest thing I've got to a religion – to me he is a god".

Film festival

Two film festivals have been named in his honor:
 International Human Rights Film Festival "Stalker", named after the film held annually in Moscow and regional centres since 1995
 International Film Festival "Zerkalo" named after Andrei Tarkovsky (meaning "mirror"), "for fans of intellectual cinema"; also known as Tarkovsky Film festival – Zerkalo, Zerkalo International Film Festival, Andrei Tarkovsky Zerkalo International Film Festival,  or simply Zerkalo, The festival is organized by a committee headed by Mikhail Men, governor of Ivanovo Oblast. Sister of Andrei Tarkovsky, Marina Tarkovsky was one of the co-founders and organizers. From 2010 the festival was directed by Pavel Lungin. In 2020, the president of the festival was Russian director Sergei Bodrov. Owing to the COVID-19 pandemic in Russia, the 14th edition was held online in 2020, and appears to be the last one held, .The festival awards a number of prizes, including the Special Award for Contribution to Andrei Tarkovsky's Cinema. Held in Ivanovo since 2007, the festival is held in July each year, with the 16th edition scheduled for 22-27 July, to be held in various cities in the Ivanovo region, with special screenings in Moscow. Films from France, India, Greece, Serbia, Colombia, Kazakhstan and other countries were entered into the competition, and a gala night was dedicated to Tarkovsky's 90th birthday, on the main square of his hometown of Yuryevets on 22 July.

See also
European art cinema
Slow cinema
Moscow International Film Festival

References
Notes

Bibliography

Schmidt, Stefan W. (2016). "Somatography and Film: Nostalgia as Haunting Memory Shown in Tarkovsky's Nostalghia." Journal of Aesthetics and Phenomenology, 3 (1): 27–41. Somatography and Film: Nostalgia as Haunting Memory Shown in Tarkovsky's Nostalghia

Further reading

External links

Andrei Tarkovsky at Senses of Cinema

Website about Andrei Tarkovsky, Films, Articles, Interviews
Andrei Tarkovsky: Biography wrestles with the filmmaker's remarkable life
Nostalghia.com - An Andrei Tarkovsky Information Site, at Film Studies Program in the Department of Communication and Culture, University of Calgary

 
1932 births
1986 deaths
20th-century Russian diarists
20th-century Russian male actors
20th-century Russian male writers
20th-century Russian non-fiction writers
20th-century Russian screenwriters
Writers from Kostroma Oblast
People from Kostroma Oblast
Gerasimov Institute of Cinematography alumni
Academic staff of High Courses for Scriptwriters and Film Directors
People's Artists of the RSFSR
Lenin Prize winners
Cannes Film Festival Award for Best Director winners
Directors of Golden Lion winners
Filmmakers who won the Best Foreign Language Film BAFTA Award
Male screenwriters
Science fiction film directors
Russian people of Polish descent
Russian people of Romanian descent
Russian diarists
Russian documentary filmmakers
Russian experimental filmmakers
Russian film directors
Russian male film actors
Russian non-fiction writers
Russian opera directors
Russian Orthodox Christians from Russia
Russian screenwriters
Soviet diarists
Soviet documentary film directors
Soviet emigrants to France
Soviet emigrants to Italy
Soviet film directors
Soviet male film actors
Soviet non-fiction writers
Soviet opera directors
Soviet screenwriters
Deaths from lung cancer in France
Burials at Sainte-Geneviève-des-Bois Russian Cemetery